Sergio Nasca (1 August 1937 – 14 August 1989) was an Italian film director and screenwriter.

Life and career 
Born in Rome, Nasca started his career in 1965 as assistant director of Enzo Battaglia in Idoli controluce, then he worked as a production manager. He made his film debut in 1974 with Il saprofita, a film which raised several controversities for its violence. His cinema was initially characterized by violent provocations gradually tempered by bittersweet tones. He died at the age of 52 of an incurable disease.

Filmography 
 1974: Il saprofita
 1975: Malía (vergine e di nome Maria)
 1977: Stato interessante
 1982: Il paramedico
 1985: D'Annunzio 
 1987: La posta in gioco

References

External links 
 

1937 births
1989 deaths
20th-century Italian screenwriters
Italian male screenwriters
Writers from Rome
Film directors from Rome
20th-century Italian male writers